Falmouth is a town, civil parish and port on the River Fal on the south coast of Cornwall, England, United Kingdom. It has a total resident population of 21,797 (2011 census).

Etymology 
The name Falmouth is of English origin, a reference to the town's situation on the mouth of the River Fal. It was at one time known as Pennycomequick, an Anglicisation of the Celtic Pen-y-cwm-cuic "head of the creek"; this is the same as Pennycomequick, a district in Plymouth.

History

Early history 

In 1540, Henry VIII built Pendennis Castle in Falmouth to defend Carrick Roads. The main town of the district was then at Penryn. Sir John Killigrew created the town of Falmouth shortly after 1613.

In the late 16th century, under threat from the Spanish Armada, the defences at Pendennis were strengthened by the building of angled ramparts. During the Civil War, Pendennis Castle was the second to last fort to surrender to the Parliamentary Army.

After the Civil War, Sir Peter Killigrew received royal patronage when he gave land for the building of the Church of King Charles the Martyr, dedicated to Charles I, "the Martyr".

The seal of Falmouth was blazoned as "An eagle displayed with two heads and on each wing with a tower" (based on the arms of Killigrew). The arms of the borough of Falmouth were "Arg[ent]. a double-headed eagle displayed Sa[ble]. each wing charged with a tower Or. in base issuant from the water barry wavy a rock also Sa. thereon surmounting the tail of the eagle a staff also proper flying therefrom a pennant Gu[les]".

Being the nearest large harbour to the entrance of the English Channel, two Royal Navy squadrons were permanently stationed here. In the 1790s one was under the command of Sir Edward Pellew (later Viscount Exmouth) and the other under the command of Sir John Borlase Warren. Each squadron consisted of five frigates, with either 32 or 44 guns. Pellew's flagship was HMS Indefatigable and Warren's HMS Révolutionnaire. At the time of the French Revolutionary Wars, battle ships and small vessels were continually arriving with war prizes taken from the French ships and prisoners of war. Near Penryn, at Tregellick and Roscrow, were two large camps for the French prisoners.

The Falmouth Packet Service operated out of Falmouth for over 160 years between 1689 and 1851. Its purpose was to carry mail to and from Britain's growing empire. At the end of the 18th century there were thirty to forty, small, full rigged, three-masted ships. The crews were hand picked and both officers and men often made large fortunes from the private contraband trade they took part in, while under the protection of being a Government ship, free from customs and excise searches and therefore payment of duty. Captain John Bullock worked in the Packet Service and built Penmere Manor in 1825.

19th and 20th centuries 

In 1805 news of Britain's victory and Admiral Nelson's death at Trafalgar was landed here from the schooner Pickle and taken to London by stagecoach. On 2 October 1836  anchored at Falmouth at the end of her noted survey voyage around the world. That evening, Charles Darwin left the ship and took the Mail coach to his family home at The Mount, Shrewsbury. The ship stayed a few days and Captain Robert FitzRoy visited the Fox family at nearby Penjerrick Gardens. Darwin's shipmate Sulivan later made his home in the nearby waterside village of Flushing, then home to many naval officers.

In 1839 Falmouth was the scene of a gold dust robbery when £47,600 worth of gold dust from Brazil was stolen on arrival at the port.

The Falmouth Docks were developed from 1858, and the Royal National Lifeboat Institution (RNLI) opened Falmouth Lifeboat Station nearby in 1867. The present building dates from 1993 and also houses Her Majesty's Coastguard. The RNLI operates two lifeboats from Falmouth: Richard Cox Scott, a   all-weather boat, and B-916 Robina Nixon Chard, an Atlantic 85 inshore lifeboat.

Near the town centre is Kimberley Park, named after the Earl of Kimberley who leased the park's land to the borough of Falmouth. Today the park has exotic and ornate plants and trees.

The Cornwall Railway reached Falmouth on 24 August 1863. The railway brought new prosperity to Falmouth, as it made it easy for tourists to reach the town. It also allowed the swift transport of the goods recently disembarked from the ships in the port. The town now has three railway stations. Falmouth Docks railway station is the original terminus and is close to Pendennis Castle and Castle beach. Falmouth Town railway station was opened on 7 December 1970 and is convenient for the National Maritime Museum Cornwall, the waterfront, Gyllyngvase beach and town centre.

Penmere railway station opened on 1 July 1925 towards the north of Falmouth and within easy walking distance of the top of The Moor. All three stations are served by regular trains from Truro on the Maritime Line. Penmere Station was renovated in the late 1990s, using the original sign and materials.

The town saw a total eclipse of the Sun at 11:11 a.m. on 11 August 1999. This eclipse lasted just over two minutes at Falmouth, the longest duration in the United Kingdom.

Second World War 

During World War II, 31 people were killed in Falmouth by German bombing. An anti-submarine net was laid from Pendennis to St Mawes, to prevent enemy U-boats entering the harbour.

It was the launching point for the noted commando raid on Saint-Nazaire in 1942. Between 1943 and 1944, Falmouth was a base for American troops preparing for the D-Day invasions. There are commemoration plaques at Turnaware Point, Falmouth Watersports marina, Tolverne and Trebah gardens.

Historic estates 
Arwenack, of which a small portion remains, was the estate which occupied the site before the development of the town of Falmouth; it was long the seat of the Killigrew family.

Governance

Falmouth Town is a civil parish within Cornwall, formed in 1974 from the historic Falmouth Borough Council. Falmouth received its Order of Charter in 1661.

As of 2019, it is governed by sixteen councillors (four represent the Boslowick Ward, three each for the Arwenack, Penwerris, Smithick and Trescobeas). Each of them serves a four-year term. The council provides municipal services while strategic services are provided by Cornwall Council, a unitary authority governing the entirety of mainland Cornwall.

From 2009 to 2021, Falmouth elected five councillors to Cornwall Council, one from each of its five divisions: Falmouth Arwenack, Falmouth Boslowick, Falmouth Penwerris, Falmouth Smithick, and Falmouth Trescobeas. Boundary changes in 2013 abolished the Falmouth Gyllyngvase division, replacing it with Falmouth Smithick. From the 2021 elections, Falmouth will be covered by four divisions: Falmouth Arwenack, Falmouth Boslowick, Falmouth Penwerris and Falmouth Trescobeas and Budock.

Economy, industry and tourism 

While Falmouth's maritime activity has much declined from its heyday, the docks are still a major contributor to the town's economy. It is the largest port in Cornwall. Falmouth remains a cargo port and the bunkering of vessels and the transfer of cargoes also keep the port's facilities busy. The port is popular with cruise ship operators.

Further up the sheltered reaches of the Fal there are several ships laid up, awaiting sailing orders and/or new owners/charterers.

Falmouth is a popular holiday destination and it is now primarily a tourist resort. The five main beaches starting next to Pendennis Castle and moving along the coast towards the Helford river are Castle, Tunnel, Gyllyngvase, Swanpool and Maenporth beaches. The National Maritime Museum Cornwall opened in February 2003. The building was designed by the architect M. J. Long.

The Falmouth & Penryn Packet, first published in 1858, is still based in the town as the lead title in a series of Packet Newspapers for central and western Cornwall.

The West Briton newspaper, first published in 1810, is a weekly tabloid newspaper which has a Falmouth & Penryn edition reporting on the area.

Culture 

Falmouth has many literary connections. The town was the birthplace of Toad, Mole and Rat: Kenneth Grahame's classic The Wind in the Willows began as a series of letters sent to his son. The first two were written at the Greenbank Hotel whilst Grahame was a guest in May 1907. Reproductions of the letters are currently on display in the hotel. Poldark author Winston Graham knew the town well and set his novel The Forgotten Story (1945) in Falmouth.

The town has been the setting for several films and television programmes. British film star Will Hay was a familiar face in Falmouth in 1935 whilst filming his comedy Windbag the Sailor.  The film had many scenes of the docks area. The docks area was featured in some scenes with John Mills for the 1948 film Scott of the Antarctic.  Robert Newton, Bobby Driscoll and other cast members of the 1950 Walt Disney film Treasure Island (some scenes were filmed along the River Fal) were visitors to the town. Stars from the BBC TV serial The Onedin Line stayed in the town during filming in the late 1970s. In 2011 Paramount Pictures filmed parts of the film World War Z starring Brad Pitt in Falmouth Docks and off the coast.

Falmouth had the first "Polytechnic": Royal Cornwall Polytechnic Society which went into administration briefly in 2010 but is now a feature of the town with frequent art exhibitions, stage performances and an art house cinema.

Falmouth is home to many theatre groups, including Falmouth Theatre Company, Falmouth Young Generation and Amity Theatre. Falmouth Theatre Company, also known as FTC, is the oldest local company with performances dating back to 1927.

The Falmouth Art Gallery is a public gallery with a diverse 19th and 20th century art collection including many notable modern Cornish artists exhibited in four to five seasonal exhibitions a year, as well as a "family friendly and free" community and schools education programme.

The Anglican parish churches are dedicated to King Charles the Martyr and to All Saints. A third church is St Michael's Church, Penwerris. The Roman Catholic church of St Mary Immaculate is in Killigrew Street. It was designed by J. A. Hansom and built in 1868; the tower and spire (1881) are by J. S. Hansom; the baptistery and porch were added in 1908 to the original designs. The style is a blend of Gothic and Burgundian Romanesque, creating a very French effect. Two of the stained glass windows are early works of Dom Charles Norris. Falmouth Methodist Church is also in Killigrew Street; the street façade is "one of the grandest expressions of Methodism in Cornwall". The United Reformed Church (originally Bible Christian) is in Berkeley Vale. The former synagogue (1816) is one of the earliest surviving synagogue buildings in England; it was in use until 1879.

Falmouth has its own community radio station Source fm broadcasting on 96.1 FM and online.

In 2016, Falmouth won the "Great British High Street 2016" award, in the 'Coastal Community' category.

Transport

Falmouth harbour 
Falmouth is famous for its harbour.  Together with Carrick Roads, it forms the third deepest natural harbour in the world, and the deepest in Western Europe. It has been the start or finish point of various round-the-world record-breaking voyages, such as those of Robin Knox-Johnston and Dame Ellen MacArthur.

During World War II the United States Navy had a large base in Falmouth harbour as well as an army base in the town.  Some of the U.S. D-day landings originated from Falmouth harbour and the surrounding rivers and creeks.

The SS Flying Enterprise, a cargo vessel that had sailed from Hamburg on 21 December 1951, ran into a storm on the Western Approaches to the English Channel. A crack appeared on her deck and the cargo shifted. A number of vessels went to her aid including the tug Turmoil which was stationed in Falmouth, but they found it impossible to take the Flying Enterprise in tow. It took several days to reach port. On 10 January the tow line parted when the ship was still  from Falmouth. Two other tugs joined the battle to save the ship and cargo, but the Flying Enterprise finally sank later that day. Captain Carlsen and the tug's mate Kenneth Dancy, the only crew members still on board, were picked up by the Turmoil and taken to Falmouth to a hero's welcome.

Road 
Falmouth is a terminus of the A39 road, connecting to Bath, Somerset some  distant although such a route has now been surpassed by the A303, A37 and A367. The A39 connects Falmouth with the A30 via Truro. The A30 provides a fast link between Falmouth and the M5 motorway at Exeter  to the northeast.

Most commercial bus services are provided by First Kernow who have an outstation in Falmouth. Other services are run by Office & Transport Services on behalf of Transport for Cornwall.

Railway 
Falmouth has three railway stations (described above) at the southern end of an  branch line (the Maritime Line) to the county town of Truro. The train takes roughly 28 minutes inbound and 24 minutes outbound. It stops at Truro, Perranwell, Penryn, Penmere, Falmouth Town and Falmouth Docks.

Ferries 
Falmouth has regular ferry routes connecting to St Mawes (aboard the St Mawes Ferry), Flushing (aboard the Flushing Ferry) and Trelissick (aboard Enterprise Boats).

Education 
There are five primary schools in the town and one secondary school, namely Falmouth School.

Falmouth University has a campus at the original town site, Woodlane, and another in the Combined Universities in Cornwall campus at Tremough, Penryn, which it shares with the University of Exeter. It offers undergraduate and postgraduate courses chiefly in the fields of Art, Design and Media.  The University of Exeter, Cornwall Campus offers a range of undergraduate and postgraduate courses, often with a particular focus on the environment and sustainability, and also hosts the world-renowned Camborne School of Mines (formerly located nearby in Camborne), which specialises in the understanding and management of the Earth's natural processes, resources and the environment.

In 2015, actor and comedian Dawn French was installed as Falmouth University's chancellor.

Falmouth Marine School, formerly Falmouth Technical College, specialises in traditional and modern boat-building, marine engineering, marine environmental science and marine leisure sport. The campus is part of Cornwall College.

Sport and recreation 
The town has a football team in the Western Football League, Falmouth Town A.F.C., who play at Bickland Park in the north-west of the town, and also Falmouth RFC, a rugby union club who play at The Recreation Ground, a site at the top of The Moor.

Falmouth is also home to one of Cornwall's biggest cricket clubs, where four teams represent the town in the Cornwall Cricket League, with the 1st team playing in the Cornwall Premier League. Falmouth CC play at the Trescobeas ground on Trescobeas Road.

With its proximity to sheltered and unsheltered waters, Falmouth has long been a popular boating and water sports location.  It is, for example, a centre of Cornish pilot gig rowing, the home of Gyllyngvase Surf Life Saving Club (founded 2008)  and a popular location for sea swimming. Solo yachtsman Robert Manry crossed the Atlantic from Falmouth, Massachusetts (which is named after Falmouth) to Falmouth, Cornwall, from June–August 1965 in the thirteen-and-a-half-foot Tinkerbelle—this was the smallest boat to make the crossing at the time.  The town was the location for the 1966, 1982 and 1998 and 2014 Tall Ships' Race in which approximately ninety Tall Ships set sail for Lisbon, Portugal.  The Town is set to host the  start of the 2021 race.

Notable people

Early times to 1780 
 Sir Robert Killigrew (1580–1633) English courtier and politician, MP between 1601 and 1629. He served as Ambassador to the United Provinces. He was a knight of Arwenack.
 Thomas Corker (c.1640 in Falmouth - 1700) was a prominent English agent for the Royal African Company and worked in the Sherbro Island Sierra Leone
 Sir William Trelawny, 6th Baronet (c.1722 – 1772), British politician and colonial administrator, MP for West Looe from 1757 to 1767, then Governor of Jamaica
 John Laurance (1750 in Falmouth – 1810) American lawyer and politician from New York.
 Eleazer Oswald (1750 in Falmouth – 1795) Journalist and soldier in British America and the American War of Independence
 Philip Melvill (1762 – 1811) philanthropist, founded Falmouth Misericordia Society 1807
 Josiah Fox (1763 in Falmouth – 1847) British naval architect, involved in the design and construction of the original six frigates of the United States Navy
 Richard Thomas, (1779 – 1858) English civil engineer

1780 to 1810 
 Robert Were Fox the Younger FRS (1789 in Falmouth – 1877) British geologist, natural philosopher and inventor, worked on the temperature of the earth and a compass to measure magnetic dip at sea
 Mary Lloyd or Mary Hornchurch (1795 in Falmouth – 1865) British joint secretary of the Birmingham Ladies Society for the Relief of Negro Slaves in 1825
 Charles Fox (1797 in Falmouth – 1878), a Quaker scientist, developed Trebah garden near Mawnan Smith, part of the influential Fox family of Falmouth
 The Revd. Henry Melvill (1798 in Pendennis Castle – 1871) priest in the Church of England, principal of the East India Company College from 1844 to 1858 and Canon of St Paul's Cathedral
 The Fox family of Falmouth were very influential in the development of the town of Falmouth in the 19th century and of the Cornish Industrial Revolution. In the 18th and 19th centuries, many of them were members of the Religious Society of Friends (Quakers).
 Sibella Elizabeth Miles (1800 in Falmouth – 1882), was an English schoolteacher, poet and writer of the 19th century.
 John Sterling (1806 – 1844), Scottish author, moved to Falmouth in 1841
 Edwin Octavius Tregelles (1806 in Falmouth – 1886) was an English ironmaster, civil engineer and Quaker minister.
 William Lobb (1809 – 1864) Cornish plant collector, employed by Veitch Nurseries of Exeter, introduced into England Araucaria araucana (the monkey-puzzle tree) from Chile
 Lovell Squire (1809 – 1892) Quaker schoolteacher, meteorologist and writer of sacred verse. In 1834 he developed a Quaker boarding school in Ashfield which ran from 1839 to 1849

1810 to 1850 
 Samuel Prideaux Tregelles (1813 in Falmouth – 1875) English biblical scholar, textual critic, and theologian.
 Nicholas Pocock (1814 in Falmouth – 1897) English academic and cleric, known as an historical writer
 Anna Maria Fox (1816 in Falmouth – 1897) promoted Royal Cornwall Polytechnic Society, from Fox family of Falmouth 
 Robert Barclay Fox (1817 – 1855) businessman, gardener and diarist, from the influential Quaker Fox family of Falmouth
 Robert Kemp Philp (1819 in Falmouth – 1882) was an English journalist, author and Chartist
 Caroline Fox (1819 in Falmouth – 1871) Cornish diarist, member of the influential Fox family of Falmouth 
 Henry George Raverty (1825 in Falmouth – 1906) was a British Indian Army officer and linguist, he studied Afghan poetry
 Elizabeth Philp (1827 in Falmouth – 1885) English singer, music educator and composer 
 William Odgers VC (1834 in Falmouth – 1873) Royal Navy sailor, recipient of the Victoria Cross in the First Taranaki War
 Howard Fox (1836 in Falmouth – 1922) shipping agent and consul, member of the influential Fox family of Falmouth.
 Edwin Welch (1838 in Falmouth – 1916) English naval cadet, surveyor, photographer, newspaper proprietor and journalist
 John Andrewartha (1839 in Falmouth – 1916) Cornish-born American architect and civil engineer
 Charles Napier Hemy RA (1841 – 1917 in Falmouth) British painter of marine paintings, moved to Falmouth in 1881
 Susan Elizabeth Gay (1845 - 1918 in Crill, Budock) chronicler of Falmouth in a book called Old Falmouth published in 1903

1850 to 1910 
 Henry Scott Tuke RA RWS (1858 – 1929), English visual artist, primarily a painter, but also a photographer
 John Charles Williams (1861 – 1939) English Liberal Unionist  politician, gardener at Caerhays Castle, where he grew and bred rhododendrons, MP for Truro 1892/95, High Sheriff of Cornwall 1888 and Lord Lieutenant of Cornwall 1918/36
 John Sydney Hicks (1864 in Falmouth – 1931) British physician and surgeon. He lived in Australia from 1891 to 1912, and was a member of the Western Australian Legislative Assembly 
 Charles Masson Fox (1866 in Falmouth – 1935) Cornish businessman, prominent in chess problems and has his place in the gay history of Edwardian England
 Robert Barclay Fox (1873 – 1934) Falmouth businessman and Conservative politician, inherited Penjerrick Garden
 Joseph Conrad, (1857 – 1924) Writer, stayed at Falmouth for nine months in 1882  and later recalled his sojourn in a short story titled Youth. Conrad's Youth 
 Sir Edward Hoblyn Warren Bolitho KBE CB DSO (1882 – 1969) Cornish landowner and politician. He was Chairman of Cornwall County Council 1941/52 and Lord Lieutenant of Cornwall 1936/62
 Frank Harold Hayman (1894 – 1966) British Labour Party politician, MP for Falmouth 1950 to 1966 
 Howard Spring (1889 - 1965) Writer, lived in Falmouth from 1947 onwards
 Edward Aylmer (1892 - 1974) First-class cricketer and Royal Navy officer
 Sir John Carew Pole, 12th Baronet (1902 – 1993) landowner, soldier, politician and Lord Lieutenant of Cornwall 1962/1977
 Colonel James Power Carne VC, DSO (1906 in Falmouth – 1986) Army officer, Korean War recipient of the Victoria Cross
 Lieutenant Commander Robert Peverell Hichens DSO* DSC** RNVR (1909 – 1943) most highly decorated officer of the Royal Navy Volunteer Reserve (RNVR) lived in Bodrennick House at Flushing, Cornwall
 Hugh St Clair Stewart MBE (1910 in Falmouth – 2011) British film editor and producer, filmed Bergen-Belsen concentration camp following its liberation in April 1945

1910 to present 
 William John Burley (1914 in Falmouth - 2002) British crime writer whose work includes the Wycliffe detective series
 John Anthony Miller aka Peter Pook (1918 in Falmouth – 1978) British author of humorous novels
 George Boscawen, 9th Viscount Falmouth (born 1919) Cornish peer and landowner, Lord Lieutenant of Cornwall from 1977-94
 William D Watson (born 1930) bow maker who worked for W.E. Hill & Sons, lived in Falmouth.
 David Mudd, (born 2 June 1933), British politician, Conservative MP for Falmouth and Camborne from 1970 until 1992
Rex Thomas Vinson (1935 in Falmouth - 2000) Art teacher, artist and science fiction author, wrote as Vincent King
 Lady Mary Christina Holborow, DCVO (born 1936) daughter of Earl of Courtown, Lord Lieutenant of Cornwall 1994-2004
 Caroline Bammel (1940 in Falmouth - 1995) British ecclesiastical historian
 Patrick Woodroffe (1940-2014) fantasy artist, taught art at Falmouth School of Art.
 Jon Mark (born 1943 in Falmouth) singer-songwriter, recorded with Marianne Faithfull, John Mayall and Mark-Almond.
 Penelope Shuttle (born 1947) British poet, lived in Falmouth since 1970, founded the Falmouth Poetry Group in 1972.
 Sebastian Newbold Coe, Baron Coe, CH, KBE, FRIBA (born 1956), referred to as Seb Coe, British politician and former track and field athlete. Won four Olympic medals at the 1980 and 1984 Summer Olympics. MP for Falmouth and Camborne from 1992-97. Elected president of the International Association of Athletics Federations in 2015.
 Paul Martin (born 1959) antiques dealer, professional drummer, presents BBC antiques programmes including Flog It!, attended Falmouth Grammar School.
 Zapoppin' (formed 2007 in Falmouth) are an alternative folk and skiffle band, noted by Clash magazine for their "black humour and obtuse lyrical themes".

Sport 
 Edward Jackett, known as John Jackett, (1878 in Falmouth – 1935) English rugby union player for British Lions and competed in the 1908 Summer Olympics, brother of Richard Jackett
 James Trick "Jimmy" Jose (1881–1963) was Cornish rugby union player for Plymouth Albion R.F.C. and Falmouth R.F.C., competed in the 1908 Summer Olympics
 Tony Kellow, (1952 in Budock Water - 2011) professional footballer, over 400 appearances mainly for Exeter City FC
 Kevin Miller (born in Falmouth 1969) English retired goalkeeper, played for Barnsley F.C. Crystal Palace F.C. Exeter City F.C. and Watford
 Matthew Etherington (born 1981 in Truro) footballer played for Falmouth Town under 14s and then for Peterborough United F.C. Tottenham Hotspur F.C. West Ham and Stoke
 Jamie Robert Day (born 1986 in Falmouth) English former footballer who mainly played for Peterborough United F.C., and Rushden & Diamonds F.C.

Landmarks

Twinning 
Falmouth is twinned with Douarnenez in Brittany, France and Rotenburg an der Wümme, in Lower Saxony, Germany.

See also 
 Falmouth, Jamaica
 List of topics related to Cornwall
 All Saints' Church, Falmouth
 St. Michael and All Angels Church, Penwerris
 Falmouth Synagogue
 Cornish and Breton twin towns

Further reading 
 Symons, Alan (1994). Falmouth's Wartime Memories. Arwenack Press. 
 Whetter, James (2003). The History of Falmouth. Lyfrow Trelyspen.

References

External links 

 
 Official Website for Falmouth
 Falmouth Town Council
 Searchable Online Catalogue at the Cornwall Record Office
 GENUKI article on Falmouth

 
Civil parishes in Cornwall
Cornish Killas
Ports and harbours of Cornwall
Ports and harbours of the English Channel
Port cities and towns in South West England
Populated coastal places in Cornwall
Seaside resorts in Cornwall
Towns in Cornwall